Anneliese Borwitz is a retired slalom canoeist who competed for East Germany in the mid-1950s. She won a silver medal in the folding K-1 team event at the 1953 ICF Canoe Slalom World Championships in Meran.

References

External links 
 Anneliese BORVITZ at CanoeSlalom.net

East German female canoeists
Possibly living people
Year of birth missing
Medalists at the ICF Canoe Slalom World Championships